Bova may refer to:

Places:
Bova, Iran (disambiguation), places in Iran
Bova, Calabria, a comune in the Province of Reggio Calabria in Italy
Bova Marina, a comune in the Province of Reggio Calabria in Italy
Roman Catholic Archdiocese of Reggio Calabria-Bova, an archdiocese in Italy
Diocese of Bova, a Roman Catholic diocese in Calabria in Italy from the seventh century until 1986

People:
Ben Bova (1932-2020), an American science fiction author and editor
Dario Bova, (born 1984), Italian footballer
Giuseppe Bova, an Italian politician, president of the Regional Council of Calabria
Jeff Bova (born 1953), an American keyboardist, composer, arranger and record producer
Joseph Bova (1924–2006), an American actor who worked in early television on a children's show on WABC-TV in New York
Louis Bova (1909-1963), the only coal miner Shepptonn, PA mine disaster that was not  found. 
Raoul Bova (born 1971), an Italian actor
Tony Bova, was a professional football player for the Pittsburgh Steelers during the 1940s.

Fiction:
Bova (comics), a Marvel Comics character
Prince Bova, a hero from Russian folklore, of literary origin

Other:
VDL Bova, better known as Bova, is a luxury coachbuilder based in Eindhoven, Netherlands which began building coaches in 1931
Board of Veterans' Appeals